Gisele Cristina Florentino (born 1 August 1973) is a Brazilian female volleyball player.

She played for the Brazil women's national volleyball team at the 1999 FIVB Volleyball Women's World Cup, and 2001 FIVB Volleyball Women's World Grand Champions Cup.

References

External links 
 
 
 

1973 births
Living people
Brazilian women's volleyball players